Jennifer Chang is an American poet and scholar.

Life and career 
Jennifer Chang was born in New Jersey. She earned a BA from the University of Chicago in 1998, and an MFA from University of Virginia in 2002, where she returned to pursue a PhD and received her degree in 2017.

Her poems have been published in American Poetry Review, Best American Poetry 2012, The Nation, The New Yorker, Poetry, and A Public Space.

Chang's debut collection of poetry, The History of Anonymity, was published in 2008 by the University of Georgia Press. This collection of lyrical poems was an inaugural selection for the VQRs (Virginia Quarterly Review) Poetry Series and a finalist for the Shenandoah/Glasgow Prize for Emerging Writers.

Her second book, Some Say The Lark, was published by Alice James Books in 2017. It was longlisted for the 2018 PEN Open Book Award and won the 2018 William Carlos Williams Award.

She lives with her family in Washington, D.C., where she is an Assistant Professor of English and Creative Writing at George Washington University.

Chang is Co-Chair of the Advisory Board for Kundiman, an organization dedicated to the creation and cultivation of Asian American literature.

Awards and honors 
 Henry Hoyns Fellowship, University of Virginia
2018 Winner of the William Carlos Williams Award
 Winner of the Virginia Quarterly Review's Poetry Series, for The History of Anonymity
 Finalist for the Shenandoah/Glasgow Prize for Emerging Writers, for The History of Anonymity
 2005 Van Lier Fellowship in Poetry at the Asian American Writers’ Workshop
 2005 Louis Untermeyer Scholarship at Bread Loaf Writers' Conference
 2005 Selection for Best New Poets
 MacDowell Colony Fellowship
 Djerassi Resident Artists Program

References

External links 
 Profile: Alice James Books > Authors > Jennifer Chang
 Profile: George Washington University > English Department Faculty > Jennifer Chang
 Audio: Jennifer Chang reads "Again A Solstice" on NPR Morning Edition
 Poems: Kenyon Review > Spring 2011 > Some Say the Lark Makes Sweet Division; Terra Incognita by Jennifer Chang
 Poems: Blackbird > Vol. 5, No. 1 Spring 2016 > Estuary, Field Guide to the Night Sky, Slept and Introductions by Jennifer Chang

American women poets
21st-century American poets
Living people
People from New Jersey
Year of birth missing (living people)
University of Chicago alumni
University of Virginia alumni
21st-century American women writers